Malik Naeem Khan Bazai is a Pakistani politician who is member-elect of the Provincial Assembly of the Balochistan.

On 8 September 2018, he was inducted into the provincial Balochistan cabinet of Chief Minister Jam Kamal Khan. On 9 September, he was made advisor on excise and taxation.

References

Living people
Awami National Party MPAs (Balochistan)
Year of birth missing (living people)